Liu Yiheng (born 3 August 2003) is a Chinese footballer currently playing as a forward for Hainan Star, on loan from Wuhan Three Towns.

Career statistics

Club
.

References

2003 births
Living people
Chinese footballers
China youth international footballers
Association football forwards
China League Two players
Wuhan Three Towns F.C. players